The 2017–18 season was Manchester City Women's Football Club's 30th season of competitive football and its fifth season in the FA Women's Super League and at the top level of English women's football.

Following a reorganisation of top-level women's football in England, the 2017–18 season was the first season in the WSL era in which the calendar runs Autumn to Spring in line with the men's game. Due to another re-organisation of the women's game, with WSL 1 becoming a league for fully professional teams only, there was no relegation in the league for this season.

Non-competitive

Pre-season

Friendly

Toulouse International Ladies Cup

Competitions

Women's Super League

League table

Results summary

Results by matchday

Matches

FA Cup

WSL Cup

Group stage

Knockout rounds

Champions League

Round of 32

Round of 16

Quarter-finals

Semi-finals

Squad information

Playing statistics

Appearances (Apps.) numbers are for appearances in competitive games only including sub appearances
Red card numbers denote:   Numbers in parentheses represent red cards overturned for wrongful dismissal.

Transfers and loans

Transfers in

Transfers out

References

Manchester City W.F.C. seasons